John Paul Gorman (March 10, 1897 – October 30, 1983) was a college football player and coach at Princeton University.

Playing career

He was a prominent quarterback for the Princeton Tigers football team. He stood 5 feet 7 inches and weighed 154 pounds.

1922

Gorman led the "Team of Destiny" which won a national title.

1923
In a postseason contest of Princeton all-stars against southern champion Vanderbilt, Gorman scored his team's points in a 7 to 7 tie. Lynn Bomar got Vandy's touchdown.

Coaching career
He coached the freshman team of his alma mater from 1930 to 1942.

References

External links
 

1897 births
1983 deaths
American football quarterbacks
Princeton Tigers football coaches
Princeton Tigers football players
People from Pompey, New York
Players of American football from New York (state)